Colorado Bend State Park is a  state park in the U.S. state of Texas, located in the Texas Hill Country region. It was purchased by the state in 1984 and opened to the public in 1987. It is representative of the karst features typically seen in the Hill Country, with many sinkholes, caves, and springs.

Hiking trails 
The Spicewood Springs trail, one of the hiking trails in the park, has numerous creek crossings. The trail is -long one way, but hikers can take a slightly different hike back. It has numerous spring-fed swimming holes along the trail.

The Gorman Creek trail is divided into a blue-marker loop and a yellow-marker loop, with dry chaparral terrain. The highlights of the park trails are a travertine creek on the east, and a large waterfall with caves on the west. A protected portion of the park is open by guided tour only. The Gorman Spring and a few other springs feed Gorman Creek, which then descends a spectacular , forming what is  known as Gorman Falls. The tour is a  round-trip trail leading to the spectacular waterfall, which is formed by fern-covered travertine. The self-guided Gorman Spring trail and the trail to the waterfall are now open to the public during regular park hours. Also, many wild-cave tour opportunities are available, ranging in difficulty from walking to crawling.

Flora 
A variety of flowers can be found in Colorado Bend State Park.

See also 
Colorado River (Texas)
Texas Hill Country
Balcones Canyonlands National Wildlife Refuge

References

External links 

 http://www.tpwd.state.tx.us/spdest/findadest/parks/colorado_bend/
 Facilities Map of Colorado Bend State Park
 Event Schedules of Colorado Bend State Park

State parks of Texas
Protected areas of San Saba County, Texas
Protected areas of Lampasas County, Texas